Narmada Kar (1893–1980), was an editor, writer and the first woman from Odisha to pass the B.A. examination.

Early life
Kar was born on 12 October 1893 to Biswanath Kar, freedom fighter, social activist and founder of Utkal Sahitya at Cuttack, India. After passing her entrance examination from Calcutta University she joined the historical Bethun College, completed her graduation on 1914 and became the first women graduate of  Odisha. At the age of 16 she married Jitendra Biswas, a Bengali lawyer. She stayed at Calcutta for the education of their children.

Death
On 13 September 1980 Kar died in her house at Calcutta, India.

References

People from Odisha
Articles created or expanded during Women's History Month (India) - 2015
1893 births
1980 deaths